Shiguanglu Station is a station on Line 22 of the Guangzhou Metro that began operations on 31 March 2022. It is situated underground at the west junction of Shiguang Road and Jinshan Avenue in Guangzhou's Panyu District, located near the Qifu New Village and Panyu Campus of the Guangdong University of Technology.

Station Layout

Exits

References

Guangzhou Metro Line 22
Guangzhou Metro stations in Panyu District